On January 23, 2019, at around 12:30 pm, five women  four employees and a customer  were shot and killed at the SunTrust Bank in Sebring, Florida. After being named a suspect, 21-year-old Zephen Xaver turned himself in to police. He has pleaded not guilty to five murders. On March 14, 2023, he pled guilty in the shooting.

Shooting 

At around 12:30 pm, a witness says he saw a man pacing back and forth inside the bank with five people lying side by side on the floor. Shots were later heard, and a man phoned the police at 12:36 pm ET, and told responders that he had shot five people.  SWAT arrived, trying to negotiate to get the barricaded suspect to leave the bank.  When those negotiations failed, members of the SWAT team entered the bank by ramming an armored vehicle through its glass front doors. The suspect eventually surrendered.

The lone survivor of the shooting was a bank employee who had been in the bank's break room just before the gunman walked in.  The employee escaped out the back door when gunshots first rang out; after getting outside, he called 911.

Victims 

Five women were discovered by police, shot execution style in their heads and backs. They were identified as:

 Debra Cook, age 54, employee
 Marisol Lopez, 55, employee
 Jessica Montague, 31, employee
 Cynthia Watson, 65, customer
 Ana Piñon-Williams, 37, employee

Perpetrator 

Zephen Allen Xaver, age 21 was identified as the perpetrator after surrendering to officers. He was identified as a former Florida Department of Corrections correctional officer trainee, with the Avon Park Correctional Institution near the Avon Park Air Force Range but resigned on January 9, 2019.

Xaver was charged with five counts of capital murder is being held by police without bond. He was appointed a public defender as he had no income or assets. On February 22, he entered a plea of not guilty in the case against him. Prosecutors intend to seek the death penalty. On March 14, 2023, he pled guilty in the shooting.

See also 

 List of mass shootings in the United States in 2019

References 

2019 in Florida
2019 mass shootings in the United States
Attacks on bank buildings
January 2019 crimes in the United States
January 2019 events in the United States
Mass shootings in Florida
Mass shootings in the United States
Sebring, Florida
2019 active shooter incidents in the United States